Carl-Axel Palm (born 20 September 1949) is a Swedish boxer. He competed in the men's featherweight event at the 1968 Summer Olympics. At the 1968 Summer Olympics, he lost to Elio Cotena of Italy.

References

1949 births
Living people
Swedish male boxers
Olympic boxers of Sweden
Boxers at the 1968 Summer Olympics
Sportspeople from Stockholm
Featherweight boxers
20th-century Swedish people